Eugene Edward Stokowski (June 23, 1921 – August 1, 1979) was an American politician and businessman.

Stokowski was born in Minneapolis, Minnesota and graduated from Edison High School in 1939. He served in the United States Marine Corps during World War II. Stokowski graduated from University of Minnesota in 1949 and was involved with the stock market. Stokowski served on the Minneapolis City Council and was a Democrat. He served in the Minnesota Senate from 1973 until his death in 1979. His wife Anne K. Stokowski also served in the Minnesota Senate.

Notes

External links

1921 births
1979 deaths
Businesspeople from Minneapolis
Politicians from Minneapolis
Military personnel from Minnesota
University of Minnesota alumni
Democratic Party Minnesota state senators
Minneapolis City Council members
20th-century American politicians
20th-century American businesspeople
Edison High School (Minnesota) alumni
United States Marine Corps personnel of World War II